Lapanella guineensis is a species of marine ray-finned fish from the family Labridae, the wrasses.

References

guineensis
Fish described in 1969